Naples-Capodichino International Airport  is the intercontinental  airport serving Naples and the Southern Italian region of Campania. According to 2019 data, the airport is the fifth-busiest airport in Italy and the busiest in Southern Italy. The airport serves as a base for easyJet, Ryanair, Volotea and Wizzair.

History
The district of Capodichino – in the area known as "Campo di Marte" – hosted the first flight exhibitions in Naples in 1910. During the First World War, "Campo di Marte" became a military airport in order to defend the town against Austro-Hungarian and German air attacks. 

During World War II, it was used as a combat airfield by the United States Army Air Forces and the Royal Air Force extensively during the Italian Campaign. The airfield was first used by RAF No. 324 Wing with its five squadrons of Supermarine Spitfires in 1943. It was then used by the US Twelfth Air Force which stationed the following units at the airport: 79th Fighter Group (January–May 1944, P-40 Warhawk/P-47 Thunderbolt); 47th Bombardment Group (March–April 1944, A-20 Havoc); 33d Fighter Group (April–May 1944, P-40 Warhawk), 332nd FG (15 Apr 44 - 28 Mar 44, P-39 Airacobra). When the combat units moved out, Air Transport Command used the airport as a major transshipment hub for cargo, transiting aircraft and personnel for the remainder of the war.

Commercial traffic started in 1950. In 1980, GE.S.A.C. ("Gestione Servizi Aeroporto Capodichino") was established to administer the airport; in 1982, it became "Gestione Servizi Aeroporti Campani" and participated in by the City Council, the province of Naples and Alitalia. In 1995 GE.S.A.C. drew up – with BAA assistance – a new master plan, which marked the beginning of a twenty-year development plan. After two years (1997), GE.S.A.C. was the first airport management company in Italy to be privatised: BAA acquires 70% of the share package from the City Council and Province of Naples.  In 1998, the "Galleria Napoli" opened, a shopping arcade open 365 days a year inside Terminal 1. In 2002, Prince Charles inaugurated the new departure lounge. 

In June 2005, the airport's maiden transatlantic flight took off. Eurofly began a seasonal service to New York City using Airbus A330s. Afterward, the airline merged with Meridiana to create Meridiana Fly, which started operating the route instead. In 2018, the carrier rebranded as Air Italy, and the flight to New York ceased. Nevertheless, United Airlines launched a link to Newark the following May; the service would operate every summer.

Facilities
The airport is class 4D ICAO and has the classification of military airport opened to commercial air traffic 24 hours/day. The airport management company is fully responsible for managing the airport and coordinating and control activities of all the private operators present in the airport. Capodichino hosts some aeronautical industrial activities like Atitech, Alenia Aeronautica, Aeronavali, Tecnam Costruzioni Aeronautiche.

Terminal
The airport has one terminal building, Terminal 1 with airside sections A, B and C handling all domestic and international flights. The landside ground level features the check-in and arrivals areas while the upper level features the main departures area A with most shops. The airside ground level contains sections B and C, with the latter being used for non-Schengen departures. As the airport does not feature jet-bridges, buses (or in a few instances walk boarding) are in use. Several areas of the terminal have been refurbished and expanded in recent years.

Apron and runway
The airport has a single runway (orientation: 06/24 –  – resistance: PCN90/F/B/W/T – assistance: PAPI, ILS) in bituminous conglomerate and concrete, with one taxiway. There is one apron with 29 stands, 9 of which are self-manoeuvring and the remaining are Push Back.

Airlines and destinations
The following airlines operate regular scheduled and charter flights at Naples Airport:

Statistics

Annual passenger statistics from 2000 through 2021:
 2000: 4,136,508 passengers (+13%)
 2001: 4,003,001 passengers (−3.2%)
 2002: 4,132,874 passengers (+3.2%)
 2003: 4,587,163 passengers (+11%)
 2004: 4,632,388 passengers (+1%)
 2005: 4,588,695 passengers (−0.9%)
 2006: 5,095,969 passengers (+11.1%)
 2007: 5,775,838 passengers (+13.3%)
 2008: 5,642,267 passengers (−2.3%)
 2009: 5,322,161 passengers (−5.7%)
 2010: 5,584,114 passengers (+4.9%)
 2011: 5,768,873 passengers (+3.3%)
 2012: 5,801,836 passengers (+0.6%)
 2013: 5,444,422 passengers (−6.2%)
 2014: 5,960,035 passengers (+9.5%)
 2015: 6,163,188 passengers (+3.4%)
 2016: 6,775,988 passengers (+9.9%)
 2017: 8,577,507 passengers (+26,6%)
 2018: 9,932,029 passengers (+15,8%)
 2019: 10,860,068 passengers (+9,3%)
 2020: 2,779,946 passengers (-74,4%)
 2021: 4,636,501 passengers (+66,8%)
 2022: 10,918,234 passengers (+42,5%)

Ground transportation

Car
Capodichino is easily accessible from all the city thanks to the exit of the so-called "Tangenziale", an urban highway (A56) connecting the city of Naples to metropolitan area and highways to Rome and Caserta (A1), Salerno (A3) and Bari, Benevento and Avellino (A16). Fixed taxi rates are in use for the main destinations within the city limits of Naples from Airport to: Naples Centre, Molo Beverello (Port), Mergellina (Hydrofoils to Capri and Ischia Islands).

Bus
Bus line 3S and Alibus, operated by ANM, connect the airport to Piazza Garibaldi and Piazza Municipio. The airport is also connected to Avellino, Benevento, Caserta, Sorrento, Salerno and Serre.

Metro
As of 2021, an extension to the existing Line 1 of Naples Metro is under construction to connect the airport with the current terminus at Naples' central station. After delays, it is expected to be finished by 2024.

Incidents and accidents
On 15 February 1958, a United States Air Force Douglas VC-47A Skytrain, 42-93817, c/n 13771, built as a C-47A-25-DK and upgraded, en route from its home base, Ramstein-Landstuhl Air Base, Germany, to Istanbul, departed Capodichino Airport on a flight to Athens, with 16 servicemen aboard. Following a report 30 minutes after departure when the crew reported en route at 6500 feet and switching to the Rome ATC, nothing further was heard from the flight, which never contacted Rome, nor arrived in Greece. Dense fog over the Ionian Sea and mountainous southern Italy on 17 February greatly impeded search efforts for the missing aircraft. "U.S. authorities did not exclude the possibility the plane might have been forced down in Communist Albania."

On 19 February 1958, the burned and scattered wreckage was found high on the rugged slope of Mount Vesuvius at the 3,800-foot level, about 200 feet below the top of the cone of the volcano. A search plane first spotted the wreckage following "four days of fruitless ground, sea and air search impeded by fog, rain and snow." Patrols of U.S. servicemen, Italian soldiers and carabinieri reached the crash site four hours after it was found, battling though heavy snow, but reported no survivors amongst the 16 on board. They stated that all had been identified. According to a 1958 Associated Press report, "a surgeon said death apparently was instantaneous." There were 15 Air Force officers and men from Ramstein-Landstuhl Air Base, and one seaman of the USS Tripoli on board. The report stated that "officials declined to venture a theory on the cause of the crash except that the weather was bad and the pilot, Capt. Martin S. Schwartz of Ashland, Kentucky, had not previously flown from Capodichino field."

Use by U.S. military forces
U.S. military forces have been present on this site, primarily US Navy personnel, since 1951.
Among two other facilities in Naples, Naval Support Activity Naples is a tenant of several buildings in the Northwestern area of the airport. The United States Navy handles military and civilian aircraft on this airport for logistics. It is home to U.S. Naval Forces Europe and the U.S. Sixth Fleet.

See also
List of the busiest airports in Italy
List of airports in Italy

References

External links

 Official website
 
 

Airports in Italy
Transport in Naples
Airfields of the United States Army Air Forces Air Transport Command in the European Theater
Airfields of the United States Army Air Forces in Italy
Airports established in 1910